Hyun, also spelled Hyeon or Hyon, Hyoun, is a Korean surname, a single-syllable Korean given name, and an element in many two-syllable Korean given names. As given name meaning differs based on the hanja used to write it. There are 42 hanja with the reading "hyun" on the South Korean government's official list of hanja which may be used in given names.

As a surname

Overview
The family name Hyun is written with only one hanja (검을 현 geomeul hyeon) meaning "dark" or "mysterious". The 2000 South Korean Census found 81,807 people and 25,547 households with this family name. In a study by the National Institute of the Korean Language based on 2007 application data for South Korean passports, it was found that 80.5% of people with this surname spelled it in Latin letters as Hyun in their passports. Another 14.9% spelled it as Hyeon, and 2.2% as Hyoun. Rarer alternative spellings (the remaining 2.4%) included Heon and Hyean.

Clans
The surviving bon-gwan (origin of a clan lineage, not necessarily the actual residence of the clan members) as of 2000 included:

 Yeonju (Nyongbyon County), North Pyongan Province: 59,096 people and 18,686 households. Yeonju is an old name of Nyongbyon County, and is located in territory which became part of North Korea after the division of Korea. The clan members claim descent from Hyeon Dam-yun (현담윤; 玄覃胤), who held the position of munha sirang pyeongjangsa (문하시랑평장사; 門下侍郞平章事) in the Secretariat-Chancellery under Myeongjong of Goryeo (r. 1170–1197).
 Seongju, North Gyeongsang Province: 4,938 people and 1,438 households. They are a branch of the Yeonju clan, claiming descent from Hyeon Dam-yun via Hyeon Gyu (현규; 玄珪), who held the position of gunsu (군수; 郡守) for Gobu County (古阜郡), Jeolla Province (today Jeongeup, North Jeolla Province) under Sejong of Joseon (r. 1418–1450).
 Gyeongju, North Gyeongsang Province: 3,534 people and 1,099 households. They claim descent from Hyeon Myeong (현명, 玄命), an official under Injo of Joseon (r. 1623–1649).
 Yeongju, North Gyeongsang Province: 1,724 people and 531 households.
 Changwon, South Gyeongsang Province: 1,261 people and 376 households. They are a branch of the Yeonju clan, claiming descent from Hyeon Dam-yun via his son Hyeon Deok-yu (현덕유; 玄德裕), who was also an official under Myeongjong of Goryeo.
 Other bon-gwan: 12,343 people and 3,387 households.
 Unknown bon-gwan: 172 people and 30 households.

People
People with the surname Hyun include:

Hyun Jae-myung (1902–1960), South Korean composer
Hyun Soong-jong (1919–2020), South Korean politician
Hyon Chol-hae (1934–2022), North Korean general
Hyon Yong-chol (1949–2015), North Korean general
Hyun Kil-un (1940–2020), South Korean writer
Hyun Ki-young (born 1941), South Korean author
Hyun Jae-hyun (born 1949), South Korean businessman
Hyun In-taek (born 1954), South Korean politician
Hyeon Taeghwan (born 1964), South Korean scientist
Hyun Jong-yeol(born 1984), South Korean data scientist
Hyun Jung-hwa (born 1969), South Korean table tennis player
Insoo Hyun (born ), Korean American bioethics professor
Hyun Jin-young (born Huh Hyun-seok, 1971), South Korean singer
Hyun Sook-hee (born 1973), South Korean judo practitioner
Hyun Joo-yup (born 1975), South Korean basketball player
Hyon Song-wol (born 1977), North Korean pop singer
Martin Hyun (born 1979), German ice hockey player and writer
Hyun Woo-sung (born 1979), South Korean actor
Hyun Young-min (born 1979), South Korean football player
Hyun Hye-sung (born 1986), South Korean field hockey player
Hyun Jyu-ni (born 1985), South Korean actress
Hyun Seung-hee (born 1996), main singer of the South Korean girl group Oh My Girl
Hyun Seung-min (born 1999), South Korean actress
Hyon Hak-bong, North Korean diplomat

As a given name

As name element
Many names containing this syllable have been popular for newborn children in South Korea, for newborn girls in the 1950s through the 1990s, and for newborn boys from the 1980s up through the 2010s:

Newborn boys
Hyun-jun (8th place in 2008 and 2009)
Hyun-woo (5th place in 1980, 2nd place in 1990, 3rd place in 2008, 5th place in 2009)
Do-hyun (9th place in 2008, 10th place in 2011)
Dong-hyun (8th place in 1980, 9th place in 1990, 10th place in 2008)
Seung-hyun (10th place in 1990)
Sung-hyun (4th place in 1990)

Newborn girls
Hyun-joo (4th place in 1970)
Hyun-jung (2nd place in 1970, 8th place in 1980)
Hyun-sook (6th place in 1950, 8th place in 1960
Ji-hyun (9th place in 1990)

Other given names containing this element include:

First syllable
Hyun-a
Hyun-hee
Hyun-jin
Hyun-kyung
Hyun-mi
Hyun-seok
Hyun-sik
Hyun-soo
Hyun-tae
Hyun-wook

Second syllable
Dae-hyun
Jae-hyun
Joo-hyun
Jung-hyun
Kwang-hyun
Sang-hyun
Seo-hyun
Si-hyun
Soo-hyun
Tae-hyun

People
People with the single-syllable given name Hyun include:

Entertainers
Joo Hyun (born Joo Il-choon, 1943), South Korean actor
Woo Hyun (born 1964), South Korean actor
Lee Hyun (born 1983), South Korean singer

Footballers
Cho Hyun (born 1974), South Korean midfielder (K-League)
Choi Hyun (born 1978), South Korean goalkeeper (K-League)
Yoo Hyun (born 1984), South Korean goalkeeper (K-League)
Park Hyun (born 1988), South Korean midfielder (K-League Challenge)
Kim Hyun (footballer) (born 1993), South Korean striker (K-League 2)

Other
Choe Hyon (1907–1982), North Korean general and politician
Yoon Hyun (born 1966), South Korean judo practitioner
Joh Hyun (born 1969), South Korean novelist
Jung Hyun (born 1994), South Korean baseball player
Chung Hyeon (born 1996), South Korean tennis player
Na Hyun, South Korean screenwriter and director

Fictional characters
Guido-Hyun, a protagonist from  anime

See also
List of Korean family names
List of Korean given names

References

Korean given names
Korean-language surnames